The Workplace Health & Safety (formerly AAOHN Journal) is a monthly peer-reviewed nursing journal and the official of the American Association of Occupational Health Nurses (AAOHN). It covers the field of occupational and environmental health nursing. It is edited by Joy E. Wachs.

External links
 

General nursing journals
Monthly journals
English-language journals
Publications established in 1953